Duan Jieyi (born 17 September 1990 in Shenyang, Liaoning) is a Chinese footballer who currently plays for Nei Mongol Zhongyou in the China League One.

Club career
Duan Jieyi started his professional football career in 2009 when he joined Shenyang Dongjin for the 2009 China League One campaign. In February 2014, he transferred to Chinese Super League club Shanghai Shenxin . On 18 October 2015, Duan made his debut for Shanghai Shenxin in the 2015 Chinese Super League against Chongqing Lifan, coming on as a substitute for Yang Jiawei in the 81st minute.
In February 2017, Duan transferred to fellow League One side Nei Mongol Zhongyou.

Career statistics 
Statistics accurate as of match played 31 December 2019.

References

External links
 

1990 births
Living people
Chinese footballers
Footballers from Liaoning
Shenyang Dongjin players
Shanghai Shenxin F.C. players
Inner Mongolia Zhongyou F.C. players
Chinese Super League players
China League One players
China League Two players
Association football defenders
21st-century Chinese people